Jamalca is an album by American jazz pianist Ahmad Jamal featuring performances recorded in 1974 and released on the 20th Century label.

Critical reception
Allmusic awarded the album 3 stars stating "This is essentially a crossover album, and while it is dated, it is still enjoyable in spots... At this point, the potential audience for this album will consist more of crate-digging rare groove enthusiasts than straight-ahead jazz fans".

Track listing
 "Ghetto Child" (Thom Bell, Linda Creed) – 5:37
 "Misdemeanor" (Leon Sylvers III) – 4:30
 "Along the Nile" (Ra Twani Az Yemeni) 4:46
 "Trouble Man" (Marvin Gaye) – 5:11
 "Jamalca" (Ahmad Jamal) – 3:54
 "Don't Misunderstand" (Gordon Parks) – 4:07
 "Theme Bahamas" (Brian Grice) – 6:09
 "Children Calling" (Joel Beale) – 4:45
 "Theme from M*A*S*H (Suicide Is Painless)" (Mike Altman, Johnny Mandel) – 2:48

Personnel
 Ahmad Jamal – piano, electric piano
 Orchestra arranged and conducted by Richard Evans

References 

20th Century Fox Records albums
Ahmad Jamal albums
1974 albums